Blewett Falls Lake (sometimes incorrectly spelled as Blewitt Falls Lake) is a reservoir located in Anson and Richmond counties in the U.S. state of North Carolina. No bridges span the lake. It is a major lake in the Uwharrie Lakes Region and the southernmost and widest body in this chain of lakes. Created by the damming of the Great Pee Dee River, the lake occupies the former Blewett Falls on that river, which were named after an early local family. The lake was created for hydropower in the early 20th century.

Aircraft crash
On April 28, 1992, a United States Air Force Lockheed C-130E Hercules, (AF Ser. No. 64-0501, c/n 3985, of the 317th Tactical Airlift Wing) from Pope AFB crashed into the lake during a training mission.  All nine crewmembers were killed.

References

Reservoirs in North Carolina
Protected areas of Anson County, North Carolina
Protected areas of Richmond County, North Carolina
Aviation accidents and incidents in North Carolina
Accidents and incidents involving United States Air Force aircraft
1992 in North Carolina
Bodies of water of Anson County, North Carolina
Bodies of water of Richmond County, North Carolina